Formigliana is a comune (municipality) in the Province of Vercelli in the Italian region Piedmont, located about  northeast of Turin and about  northwest of Vercelli.

Formigliana borders the following municipalities: Balocco, Carisio, Casanova Elvo, Santhià, and Villarboit.

Demographic evolution

References

Cities and towns in Piedmont